Prince Maurits Willem Pieter Hendrik of Orange-Nassau, van Vollenhoven (born 17 April 1968) is a member of the Dutch royal family as the eldest son of Princess Margriet of the Netherlands and Pieter van Vollenhoven.

Before the succession of his cousin Willem-Alexander as King, he was a member of the Dutch Royal House and tenth in the line of succession to the Dutch throne. With Willem-Alexander's succession however, he is no longer a member of the Dutch Royal House, and is no longer in line to direct succession to the Dutch throne.

Life and career
Maurits was born on 17 April 1968. His godparents are Princess Christina of the Netherlands, Prince Alois-Konstantin of Lowenstein-Wertheim-Rosenberg, Jhr. G. Krayenhof, and The Dutch Merchant Fleet. Van Vollenhoven has three brothers: Bernhard, Pieter-Christiaan, Floris.

In 1987, van Vollenhoven performed military service with the Royal Netherlands Marine Corps and the Royal Netherlands Navy. He graduated at University of Groningen in 1995, where he obtained a MSc degree in Economics. After his study he worked for the Schiphol Airport Authority, where he occupied several positions, including Senior Manager of Passenger Services. From September 2001 to May 2006, the prince worked for Philips (Domestic Appliances and Personal Care) in Amersfoort, where he was in charge of part of the Philishave portfolio.

In May 2006, van Vollenhoven started his own business, The Source, which focuses on innovative concepts for products, services and systems for both business and government. Since 1 May 2013, Maurits is Aide-de-camp to King Willem-Alexander and promoted to the rank of Commander (Dutch: Kapitein-lieutenant ter Zee) in the Royal Netherlands Navy.

Marriage and family
In 1989, van Vollenhoven met Marilène (Marie-Helène) van den Broek b. 4 February 1970, the youngest daughter of Hans van den Broek and Josee van Schendel. Their civil marriage ceremony was in Apeldoorn on 29 May 1998, followed by a religious ceremony on 30 May. He was the first grandchild of Queen Juliana and Prince Bernhard of the Netherlands who married.

Together, the couple has three children: 
 Anastasia (Anna) Margriet Joséphine van Lippe-Biesterfeld van Vollenhoven (Amsterdam, 15 April 2001) - the first legitimate great-grandchild of Queen Juliana and Prince Bernhard,
 Lucas Maurits Pieter Henri van Lippe-Biesterfeld van Vollenhoven (Amsterdam, 26 October 2002), 
 Felicia Juliana Bénedicte Barbara van Lippe-Biesterfeld van Vollenhoven (Amsterdam, 31 May 2005). 
By Royal Decree of 26 May 1998, the children of van Vollenhoven bear the surname "van Lippe-Biesterfeld van Vollenhoven", without titles.

Upon the abdication of Queen Beatrix, which took place on 30 April 2013, it was confirmed that the children of Princess Margriet and Pieter van Vollenhoven would no longer be eligible to succeed to the throne, and that they would also cease to be members of the Royal House according to The Membership of the Royal House Act.

Titles and styles
 1968–present: His Highness Prince Maurits of Orange-Nassau, van Vollenhoven

Ancestry

References

External links
 Royal House of the Netherlands
 Website Royal House – Family Van Vollenhoven 

1968 births
Living people
Aide-de-camp to the Monarch of the Netherlands
Directors of Philips
Dutch businesspeople
Dutch nonprofit directors
Protestant Church Christians from the Netherlands
Hybrid electric vehicle advocates
Royal Netherlands Navy officers
Royal Netherlands Marine Corps officers
Princes of Orange-Nassau
University of Groningen alumni